The Honda Shuttle name has been used by the Japanese manufacturer Honda to denote several different motorized vehicles since 1983.

Automobiles 

 A five-door wagon released in 1983 which was based on the Honda Civic (third generation) hatchback automobile. The vehicle is known as the Wagon and Wagovan in the US, and the Shuttle in the rest of the world.
 Honda Fit Shuttle – A five-door wagon released in 2011 which was based on the Fit/Jazz hatchback automobile. The vehicle is known as the Fit in Japan, China, as well as in Americas. It is called the Jazz in Europe, Oceania, the Middle East, Southeast Asia, India, and Africa.
 A minivan model of the international Honda Odyssey manufactured by Japanese automaker Honda since 1994, marketed worldwide, and now in its fifth generation. 

The three models have no relation to each other.

Shuttle